is a Japanese actress and tarento. She is formerly represented with Asia Business Partners. Her husband was actor Masahiro Inoue.

Biography
In 2003, Natsuki was selected as the young Nala in the musical The Lion King of Shiki Theatre Company.

From April 2015, she made regular appearances in the Nippon TV informational programme Zip!

From October in the same year, Natsuki became the main caster of Asahi Satellite Broadcasting's news programme ''CNN Saturday Night.

In 19 December 2016, on her own Instagram, she announced that she is married with actor Masahiro Inoue and became pregnant with her first child.

Natsuki left her agency in 2017, and currently became a freelancer.

It was announced on Instagram on 15 May 2020 that Natsuki and Inoue have now divorced.

Filmography

Stage

Informational-variety programmes

TV dramas

Films

Advertisements

References

External links
 – Affiliated office page 

Japanese stage actresses
Actors from Chiba Prefecture
Japanese people of American descent
1992 births
Living people